Biure is a municipality in the comarca of the Alt Empordà in Girona, Catalonia, Spain. It is situated to the north-west of Figueres, to which it is linked by the GE-504 road.

Demography

References

 Panareda Clopés, Josep Maria; Rios Calvet, Jaume; Rabella Vives, Josep Maria (1989). Guia de Catalunya, Barcelona: Caixa de Catalunya.  (Spanish).  (Catalan).

External links
Official website 
 Government data pages 

Municipalities in Alt Empordà
Populated places in Alt Empordà